Königshütte is a German village in the district of Harz, in the state of Saxony-Anhalt. Since 1 January 2010 is a part of the municipality of Oberharz am Brocken.

Location 
Königshütte lies on the B 27 federal road in the Harz mountains; a state road branching off to  Tanne (Harz) in the centre of the village. Immediately below the settlement under the ruins of Königsburg castle is the confluence of the Kalte Bode and Warme Bode, which unite here to form the River Bode, which initially flows into the Königshütte Reservoir and then on towards Rübeland.

Königshütte is one of the waypoints on the Harzer Hexenstieg which runs past the site of the old Trogfurth Bridge.

History 
The once independent village emerged from the merger of Königshof and Rothehütte on 1 April 1936. Rothehütte was particularly known for being the home of several iron works such as the Neue Hütte and the Lüdershof.

Königshütte used to have a railway connexion to Blankenburg (Harz), but passenger services were withdrawn on the electrified section from Elbingerode–Königshütte on 30 May 1999 and the line was closed completely on 31 August 2000.

The hitherto independent municipality was incorporated into the town of Elbingerode on 1 January 2004, which became part of Oberharz am Brocken in 2010.

Places of interest 
 Heimatstube
 Königshütte Waterfall
 Bockberg nature reserve
 Königshütte Reservoir
 Mandelholz Reservoir
 Königsburg ruins
 Ruins of St Andrew's Church on a footpath towards Elbingerode
 The Ackertklippe crag with views to the Brocken

Memorials 

 Memorial to the forestry scientist, 
 Graves in village cemetery (Ortsfriedhof) of two Soviet and one Dutch people, who were abducted during the Second World War, taken to Germany and were victims of forced labour.

References 

Former municipalities in Saxony-Anhalt
Oberharz am Brocken
Villages in the Harz